Year 1363 (MCCCLXIII) was a common year starting on Sunday (link will display the full calendar) of the Julian calendar.

Events 
 January–December 
 April 9 – Haakon VI of Norway marries Margaret I of Denmark.
 August – The Revolt of Saint Titus, against the rule of the Republic of Venice in the Kingdom of Candia (island of Crete), begins.
 August 30–October 4 – Battle of Lake Poyang: The Dahan rebel forces of Chen Youliang are defeated by the Red Turban Rebel forces of Zhu Yuanzhang, during the final decade of Yuan Dynasty control over China. Zhu's naval forces of 200,000 are pitted against Chen's naval forces of 650,000 troops, in what is not only the largest naval battle of the medieval age, but also one of the largest naval battles in history.

 Date unknown 
 Byzantine–Ottoman wars
 Ottoman Turks seize Filibe (Philippopolis) in Thrace.
 The Byzantine Empire wins a naval battle over the Ottoman Empire near Megara, Greece.
 Dmitry Donskoy, Prince of the Grand Duchy of Moscow, dethrones Dmitry of Suzdal to become Grand Prince of Vladimir.
 Philip the Bold becomes duke of Burgundy.
 Al-Afdal al-Abbas succeeds Al-Mujahid Ali as Rasulid Sultan of Yemen.
 The Mosque-Madrassa of Sultan Hassan is completed in Cairo, Egypt.

Births 
 July 2 – Maria, Queen of Sicily (d. 1401)
 December 13 – Jean Gerson, chancellor of the University of Paris (d. 1429)
 date unknown
 Margaret of Bavaria, Burgundian regent (d. 1423)
 Thomas Langley, bishop of Durham and lord chancellor of England (d. 1437)
 probable – Zeami Motokiyo, Japanese actor and playwright (d. 1443)

Deaths 
 January 13 – Meinhard III, Count of Tyrol
 March 3 – Simone Boccanegra, first doge of Genoa (approximate date)
 c. April – Blanche of Namur, queen consort of Sweden (b. 1320)
 July 29 – John Bardolf, 3rd Baron Bardolf (b. 1314)
 August 23 – Chen Youliang, founder of the Dahan regime (b. 1320)
 October 7 – Eleanor de Bohun, Countess of Ormonde (b. 1304)
 date unknown
Adil-Sultan, khan of the Chagatai Khanate
 Jean Buridan, French philosopher (b. 1295)
 probable – Ranulf Higdon, English chronicler (b. c. 1299)

References